Winston Vernon Saunders CMG (3 October 1941 – 25 November 2006) was a Bahamian educator, lawyer, actor, playwright and cultural director.

Early life

In his youth, Saunders attended Government High School in Nassau, Bahamas, later becoming head boy there.  Having attended the Bahamas Teachers’ College, Saunders obtained a Bachelor of Arts (BA) in Classics from the University of London in 1964. Saunders taught English at St Anne's High School in Nassau from 1964 until 1968.

In April 1968, Saunders married Gail North. and, in the fall of that year, returned to London to obtain a postgraduate certificate in education at the University of London.

Saunders served as vice-principal of RM Bailey Senior High School from 1969 to 1970. In 1970, he joined a law firm as an articled clerk.  Saunders was called to the Bahamas Bar in 1974 and later became a partner in the prestigious Bahamian law firm of McKinney, Bancroft and Hughes.

Career

An actor, playwright, director and producer, Saunders assumed the position of chairman of the Dundas Centre for the Performing Arts from 1975 to 1998.

Saunders was the author of two notable Bahamian plays – Them and You Can Lead A Horse To Water – as well as the Nehemiah Quartet series.

In the Bahamas, Saunders founded the:
 National Youth Choir 
 National Dance Company; 
 National Children's Choir; and 
 modern Dundas Centre for the Performing Arts.

Saunders won a number of awards including:
 DANSAs for playwriting
 the Meta
 a special DANSA for Excellence in Theatre 
 the Chamber of Commerce Distinguished Citizen Award for contribution to Culture; and
 the Silver Jubilee Award for Culture.

Saunders was Her Majesty's Coroner for the Bahamas from 1993 and 2000.

In 2004, Saunders was made a Companion of the Order of St Michael and St George (CMG).

Death

Saunders died in Jamaica on 25 November 2006, where, in his role as chairman of the Bahamas’ National Commission on Cultural Development, he was assisting in discussions to plan the commemoration of the 200th anniversary of the abolition of the slave trade in the British Empire.

Saunders was survived by his wife Dr. Gail Saunders OBE, the director-general of Heritage in the Bahamas.

References

1941 births
2006 deaths
Bahamian dramatists and playwrights
Alumni of the University of London
People from Nassau, Bahamas
Bahamian male actors
20th-century dramatists and playwrights
20th-century Bahamian lawyers